Pier Donato Cesi (1521–1586) was an Italian Catholic Cardinal from the noble Cesi family. He is sometimes referred to as Pier Donato Cesi, seniore (senior) to differentiate between him and his relative Pier Donato Cesi iuniore (1583–1656).

In 1570 he was elevated to the Cardinalate and installed as Cardinal-Priest of Santa Barbara then San Vitale and finally Sant'Anastasia in 1584.

He bought in 1565 together with his brother Cardinal Ottavio Cesi, bishop of Todi, the Palazzo Armellini in Borgo, and took charge of the restructuring, relying for the new project to Martino Longhi the Elder, who between 1570 and 1588 oversaw the renovation in its present form.  Being like his brother an art lover, he hosted in his palace a large antiques collection and a large library. 

Cesi was nominated at the Papal conclave of 1585 but was not elected.

While bishop, he was the principal co-consecrator of Filippo Maria Campeggi, Coadjutor Bishop of Feltre (1559); and Giulio Sauli, Bishop of Brugnato (1566).

References

Sources

1521 births
1586 deaths
Clergy from Rome
16th-century Italian cardinals
Cardinals created by Pope Pius V
16th-century Italian Roman Catholic bishops
Cesi family